St Mirren B.C. are a Scottish basketball club based in the city of Paisley, Scotland.

History
St Mirren National League basketball started as part of the Paisley & District Basketball Association in 1997, although the association had begun basketball related activities in 1995. St Mirren McDonald's, as they would then be known, was launched at a press conference in St Mirren Football Stadium. The team would win the Scottish Cup for the first time in 1999, defeating Edinburgh 70–62, at the Kelvin Hall International Sports Arena. Their 2nd Scottish Cup success would come just three years later against the same opposition, defeating the Kings 61-51 at Meadowbank. The team won their first National League title in 2000 in front of 600 frenzied home fans at the Saints Arena.

Honours
 Scottish Cup (4): 1999-00, 2001-02, 2011-12, 2015-16
 Scottish Men's National League (2): 1999-00, 2017-18

Season-by-season records

References

External links

1997 establishments in Scotland
Basketball teams established in 1997
Basketball teams in Scotland
Sport in Paisley, Renfrewshire